The spouse of the president of Ireland is the wife or husband of the president of Ireland. The term "first lady" or "first gentleman" is not used in any official context.

List of spouses

Notes

See also
List of spouses or partners of the Taoiseach

References

 
Ireland